The Singles is the second greatest hits album of Savage Garden, released in Australia on 12 June 2015. Its release was in mark of the 20th anniversary of the band's signing to Roadshow Music in 1995, released through Universal who had acquired the band's catalogue due to the folding of Roadshow in 2013, and coincided with re-released expanded editions of their two studio albums Savage Garden and Affirmation. The compilation also contains a DVD featuring almost all of the band's music videos (only missing the second version of To the Moon and Back and the first version of Affirmation). A previously unreleased track, a demo from 1994 entitled "She", was premiered and released on 15 May and also features on the album. A limited edition of the album was released in Japan on May 25, 2016, and features an image of Josuke Higashikata from the Diamond is Unbreakable arc of JoJo's Bizarre Adventure after the track "I Want You" was used as the ending theme of the anime adaptation.

Track listing

Charts

Weekly charts

Certifications

References

2015 greatest hits albums
Savage Garden albums
Savage Garden video albums
2015 video albums
Music video compilation albums
Compilation albums by Australian artists